The 1901–02 season was the 10th in the history of the Western Football League.

Like the previous season, Portsmouth were the champions of Division One, and along with all the other members of Division One, also competed in the Southern League during this season. Portsmouth ultimately won both leagues, achieving a double. The Division Two champions for the third season running were Bristol East.

Division One
One new club joined Division One, which remained at nine clubs after Bristol City joined the Football League.
West Ham United

Division Two
Four new clubs joined Division Two, which was increased to nine clubs from eight after Bedminster St Francis and Fishponds left, and Weston (Bath) resigned during the previous season before playing a match.
Bristol Rovers Reserves
St George, rejoining the league after leaving in 1899.
Swindon Town Reserves
Trowbridge Town, rejoining the league after leaving in 1899.
Cotham changed their name to Cotham Amateurs.

References

1901-02
1901–02 in English association football leagues